Afronausibius is a genus of beetles in the family Silvanidae, containing the following species:

 Afronausibius abnormis Grouvelle
 Afronausibius pumilus Halstead, 1980

References

Silvanidae genera